Battle of Xiangjiang River is a 2017 Chinese war film directed by Chen Li, written by Liu Jianwei, Bai Tiejun and Xiang Xiaomi, and starring Wang Ying, Xu Jian, Dong Yong, Bao Jianfeng, Sun Weimin and Zhang Yishan. The film picks up the story of the 34th division of the Red Army officers and soldiers paid great sacrifice to cover the Central Committee of the Chinese Communist Party through Xiangjiang River, and successfully broke through the blockade of the Kuomintang.

Plot
From November 27, 1934 to December 1, the Red Army fought with the Kuomintang army in Xing'an County, Quanzhou County and Guanyang County in the territory of Guangxi province for 5 days, finally, the Red Army through Xiangjiang in the border of Quanzhou County and Xing'an County, they broke through the blockade of the Kuomintang army.

Cast
 Wang Ying as Mao Zedong, chairman of the Central Executive Committee of the Chinese Soviet Republic.
 Dong Yong as Peng Dehuai, regimental commander of the 3rd Rred Regiments.
 Xu Jian as Zhou Enlai, member of the Central Executive Committee of the Chinese Soviet Republic, political commissar of the 3rd Rred Regiments.
 Sun Weimin as Lin Deshui, Mao Zedong's tailor.
 Bao Jianfeng as Chen Shuxiang, division commander of the 24th Division headquarters.
 Geng Le as Geng Biao
 Zhang Yishan as Li Tianyou
 Wang Dazhi as Huwa
 Hou Tianlai as He Jian, governor of Hunan province.
 Liu Zhibing as Bai Chongxi

Production
Battle of Xiangjiang River employed more than 35,000 extras, 2 tons of TNT explosive, and 80 tons of gasoline.

Battle of Xiangjiang River marked the second collaboration between Chen Li and Ju Wenpei, after their first collaboration My Uncle Zhou Enlai.

Release
The film premiered in Beijing on November 27, 2016 with wide-release in China on June 30, 2017.

Reception

Box office
The film grossed 73.076 million yuan in Chinese box office.

Accolades

References

External links
 
 
 

2017 films
2010s Mandarin-language films
Films set in Guangxi
Chinese war films
2010s war films